Drăghiceni is a commune in Olt County, Oltenia, Romania. It is composed of three villages: Drăghiceni, Grozăvești, and Liiceni.

Natives
 Dumitru Marcu

References

Communes in Olt County
Localities in Oltenia